Notosetia neozelanica is a species of minute sea snail, a marine gastropod mollusc, unassigned in the superfamily Seguenzioidea.

Distribution
This marine species occurs off New Zealand.

References
 Suter, H. (1898). Revision of the New Zealand Rissoiidae. Proceedings of the Malacological Society of London. 3: 2-8
 Powell A. W. B., New Zealand Mollusca, William Collins Publishers Ltd, Auckland, New Zealand 1979 
 Ponder W. F. (1985). A review of the Genera of the Rissoidae (Mollusca: Mesogastropoda: Rissoacea). Records of the Australian Museum supplement 4: 1-221

neozelanica
Gastropods of New Zealand
Gastropods described in 1898